Stefan Mair (born June 6, 1967) is an Italian ice hockey coach of the Italian national team.

References

External links

1967 births
Living people
Italian ice hockey forwards
Ice hockey people from Bolzano
Bolzano HC players
HC Varese players
HC Pustertal Wölfe players
Ritten Sport players
HC Merano players
Italy men's national ice hockey team coaches